Counsellor at Law is a 1933 American pre-Code drama film directed by William Wyler. The screenplay by Elmer Rice is based on his 1931 Broadway play of the same title.

Plot
The story focuses on several days in a critical juncture in the life of George Simon, who rose from his humble roots in a poor Jewish ghetto on the Lower East Side of Manhattan to become a shrewd, highly successful attorney. Earlier in his career, he allowed a guilty client to perjure himself on the witness stand because he believed the man could be rehabilitated if freed. Rival lawyer Francis Clark Baird has learned about the incident and is threatening to expose George, which will lead to his disbarment. The possibility of a public scandal horrifies his socialite wife Cora, who plans to flee to Europe with Roy Darwin. Devastated by his wife's infidelity, George is about to leap from the window of his office in the Empire State Building when his secretary Regina, who is in love with him, comes to his rescue.

Cast
 John Barrymore as George Simon
 Bebe Daniels as Regina Gordon
 Doris Kenyon as Cora Simon
 Isabel Jewell as Bessie Green
 Melvyn Douglas as Roy Darwin
 Onslow Stevens as John Tedesco
 Thelma Todd as Lillian La Rue
 Mayo Methot as Zedorah Chapman
 Vincent Sherman as Harry Becker
 Richard Quine as Richard Dwight, Jr.
 John Qualen as Johan Breitstein
 Angela Jacobs as Goldie

Cast notes
 Clara Langsner, J. Hammond Dailey, Malka Kornstein, Marvin Kline, T. H. Manning, John Qualen, Angela Jacobs, Elmer H. Brown and Conway Washburn reprised their roles from the Broadway production.
 Vincent Sherman made his film debut in Counsellor at Law.  He had previously appeared in a Chicago production of the play.

Production

After directing a series of films he considered inconsequential, William Wyler was happy to be assigned to a prestigious project based on a play that had enjoyed successful runs on Broadway and in Chicago, Los Angeles, and San Francisco. Producer Carl Laemmle Jr. paid $150,000 for the screen rights, an unusually high price tag during the Great Depression, and to ensure the film's success he hired Elmer Rice to adapt his own play.

In early August 1933, Wyler met Rice in Mexico City, where he was vacationing with his family, for preliminary discussions about the script. Rice was loath to mix business with pleasure and assured the director he would begin working as soon as his holiday ended. On August 22, he shipped a first draft from his New York office to Universal Pictures. Wyler approved of the screenplay, and principal photography was slated to begin on September 8.

Laemmle wanted to cast Paul Muni as George Simon, the role he had created on stage, but the actor declined because he feared being typecast as Jewish. Edward G. Robinson, Joseph Schildkraut, and William Powell were considered before Laemmle decided to cast against type and offer the role to John Barrymore in order to capitalize on his box office appeal. Both Wyler and Rice wanted to cast performers from the various stage productions, and although several screen tests were made, most of the roles were filled by studio contract players. Vincent Sherman, who had been in the Chicago production, was signed to reprise his small role of Harry Becker, a young radical with Communist leanings; he later became a prolific film and television director. Another cast member, Richard Quine, then 13, similarly went on to a career as a director, writer and producer.

Soon after filming began, Wyler realized much of the material Rice had excised from his play was necessary to build scenes, and he began incorporating it back into the screenplay. Eventually he worked with both the screenplay and play script at hand, a procedure he would follow when making The Little Foxes in later years.

Barrymore had signed for $25,000 per week, and Wyler was ordered to film all his scenes as quickly as possible. What should have taken two weeks ultimately took three-and-a-half because the actor could not remember his lines. After taking twenty-seven takes to complete one brief scene, Wyler decided to resort to cue cards strategically placed around the set. Also adding to delays was Barrymore's heavy drinking, which frequently gave his face a puffy appearance that required the makeup crew to tape his jowls. Between dealing with Barrymore and trying to comply with Laemmle's demands to complete the film on schedule and within the allotted budget, Wyler was tense and irritable and tended to take out his frustrations on the supporting cast.

Three months after filming began, the film opened to critical and commercial success at Radio City Music Hall on December 11, 1933.

Reception

Box office
The film was a box office success, described by film historian Elizabeth Kendall as a "highbrow hit", although a November 1934 article in The New York Times termed it a commercial disappointment for Universal.

Critical reception
Mordaunt Hall of The New York Times said the film "moves along with lusty energy, the scenes being so complete that none of them seems a fraction of a minute too long. Parts of the stage work have perforce been omitted, but where this occurs Mr. Rice and the director, William Wyler, leave nothing in doubt." He praised Barrymore for giving his role "the vigor, imagination and authority one might expect" and added, "The characterization is believable and thoroughly sympathetic."

The Hollywood Reporter said the film proved "the value of having a playwright adapt his own brainchild to the screen." It also praised Wyler for giving it "a far better tempo than the play possessed" and added, "He milks each situation and lets it go without stressing . . . many scenes which could easily have ensnared a less capable director."

Years later, in a critique of Barrymore's career, Pauline Kael described his portrayal of George Simon as "one of the few screen roles that reveal his measure as an actor."

References
Notes

Bibliography
Herman, Jan, A Talent for Trouble: The Life of Hollywood's Most Acclaimed Director. New York: G.P. Putnam's Sons 1995. 
Kael, Pauline, 5001 Nights at the Movies. New York: Holt, Rinehart and Winston 1984.

External links

 
 
 
 
 Counsellor at Law at the Internet Broadway Database
 Poster for 1952 re-release
 Lobby card keepsake of the film

1933 films
1933 drama films
American black-and-white films
American drama films
American films based on plays
1930s English-language films
Films about infidelity
Films about lawyers
Films directed by William Wyler
Films set in New York City
Universal Pictures films
1930s American films